The term German Empire (Deutsches Kaiserreich) commonly refers to Germany, from its foundation as a unified nation-state on 18 January 1871, until the abdication of its last Kaiser, Wilhelm II, on November 9, 1918. Germans, when referring to the Reich in this period under the Kaisers, 1871 to 1918, typically use the term Kaiserreich.

Federal prince (Bundesfürst) was the generic term for the royal heads of state (monarchs) of the various states making up the German Empire. The empire was a federal state, with its constituent states remaining sovereign states. In total, there were 22 federal princes of the German Empire and additionally three republican heads of state and the steward of the imperial territory ruled by Alsace-Lorraine. The states became part of the Kaiserreich by an 1871 treaty. The Kaiser as head of the empire was granted the title German Emperor (the style "Emperor of Germany" being deliberately avoided), and was simultaneously a federal prince as King of Prussia, the sovereign of its largest federal state. Of the princely heads of state, 4 held the title King (König) (the Kings of Prussia, Bavaria, Saxony, and Württemberg), 6 held the title Grand Duke (Großherzog), 5 held the title Duke (Herzog), and 7 held the title Prince (i.e. Sovereign Prince, Fürst).

Following the abdication of Wilhelm II on 9 November 1918 and German Revolution of 1918–19, the German nobility and royalty as legally defined classes were abolished on 11 August 1919 with the promulgation of the Weimar Constitution, under which all Germans were made equal before the law, and the legal rights and privileges, and all following German Houses, titles, insignia and ranks of nobility were abolished.

The list does not include local rulers in German colonies such as Yuhi V of Rwanda and Mwambutsa IV of Burundi.

German Emperor (1918)

Kings and Kingdoms (1918)

Grand Dukes and Grand Duchies (1918)

Dukes and Duchies (1918)

Princes and Principalities (1918)

November Revolution abdications 
Throughout the month of November 1918, all 22 monarchs within the German Empire were either forced to abdicate, or stepped down of their own accord. Duke Ernest Augustus of Brunswick was the first to do so on 8 November. The next day, the Emperor and King of Prussia Wilhelm II, went into exile in the Netherlands, and his abdication (which he would not officially confirm until 28 November, see below) was announced by his Chancellor and Prussian Minister President Maximilian of Baden. MSDP co-chairman Philipp Scheidemann proclaimed the new "German Republic" from the Reichstag building to gathered crowds, while two hours thereafter Spartacist leader Karl Liebknecht proclaimed the "Free Socialist Republic of Germany" at Berlin Palace. Neither proclamation of the republic was constitutional, and the political situation remained chaotic for several more months, with a short civil war between radical leftist revolutionaries and the more moderate post-imperial social democrat government that would emerge victorious and form the Weimar Republic. Nevertheless, the proclamations and Wilhelm II's abdication triggered a powerful domino effect: the same day a number of other princes stepped down, and within a week most monarchs in Germany had followed suit. The last to abdicate was King William II of Württemberg on 30 November 1918.

Imperial statement of abdication (1918) 

I herewith renounce for all time claims to the throne of Prussia and to the German Imperial throne connected therewith.At the same time I release all officials of the German Empire and of Prussia, as well as all officers, non-commissioned officers and men of the navy and of the Prussian army, as well as the troops of the federated states of Germany, from the oath of fidelity which they tendered to me as their Emperor, King and Commander-in-Chief. I expect of them that until the re-establishment of order in the German Empire they shall render assistance to those in actual power in Germany, in protecting the German people from the threatening dangers of anarchy, famine, and foreign rule. Proclaimed under our own hand and with the imperial seal attached. Amerongen, 28 November 1918. Signed WILLIAM.''

See also
 Abdication of Wilhelm II
 German nobility in Nazi Germany
 German Empire
 German Emperor
 History of Germany
 History of Prussia
 Hohenzollern Castle
 Crown of William II
 King in Prussia
 List of German monarchs
 Year of the Three Emperors
 List of monarchs of Prussia
 List of rulers of Saxony
 List of rulers of Württemberg
 Kings of Germany family tree

References

•

Monarchy in Germany
 
 1918
 
Government of the German Empire